Prosopidia caeruleocephala is a moth in the subfamily Arctiinae. It was described by Rothschild in 1912.

References

Natural History Museum Lepidoptera generic names catalog

Moths described in 1912
Arctiinae